Pheophorbide a oxygenase (pheide a monooxygenase, pheide a oxygenase, PAO) is an enzyme with systematic name pheophorbide-a,NADPH:oxygen oxidoreductase (biladiene-forming). This enzyme catalyses the following chemical reaction

 Pheophorbide a + NADPH + H+ + O2  red chlorophyll catabolite + NADP+

Pheophorbide a oxygenase participates in chlorophyll degradation. Loss-of-function mutations in the gene can lead to a stay-green phenotype in plants.

References

External links 
 

EC 1.14.15